Kaplja Vas is a settlement in the Municipality of Prebold in east-central Slovenia. The village core lies on the flatlands on the right bank of the Savinja River northwest of Prebold and its territory extends into the hills to the south, to the top of Fat Peak (756 m). The area is part of the traditional region of Styria. The entire municipality is now included in the Savinja Statistical Region.

References

External links
Kaplja Vas at Geopedia

Populated places in the Municipality of Prebold